The West Indies cricket team toured New Zealand in January to February 1995 and played a two-match Test series against the New Zealand national cricket team which they won 1-0. New Zealand were captained by Ken Rutherford and the West Indies by Courtney Walsh. In addition, the teams played a three-match series of Limited Overs Internationals (LOI) which West Indies won 3–0.

Test series summary

First Test

Second Test

One Day Internationals (ODIs)

West Indies won the series 3-0.

1st ODI

2nd ODI

3rd ODI

References

External links

1995 in West Indian cricket
1995 in New Zealand cricket
International cricket competitions from 1994–95 to 1997
New Zealand cricket seasons from 1970–71 to 1999–2000
1995